The Gorodskoi Katok (Kyrgyz and Russian: Городской Каток) is an ice rink located in Bishkek, Kyrgyzstan. The capacity of the ice rink has 750 people. It is used for ice hockey and figure skating.

External links
http://katok.kg 
http://www.ski.kg/katki/825-gorodskojj-katok.html 
Bishkek Skating Rink at Eurohockey.com

2008 establishments in Kyrgyzstan
Buildings and structures in Bishkek
Ice hockey in Kyrgyzstan
Indoor ice hockey venues
Figure skating venues
Sport in Bishkek
Sports venues completed in 2008
Sports venues in Kyrgyzstan